Cauayan, officially the Municipality of Cauayan,  is a 1st class municipality and the most populous municipality in the province of Negros Occidental, Philippines. According to the 2020 census, it has a population of 108,480 people.

With a population of 102,165 inhabitants, it is the most-populated out of the 19 municipalities in Negros Occidental.

History
Before the Spaniards came to Negros, this town was a wilderness and local indigenous people dwelling there depended on hunting and fishing. The site from where the town began was covered with bamboo thickets called kawáyan in the Hiligaynon language, hence the name "Cauayan" (pronounced kawayán, "place where bamboo grows abundantly).

In 1822, Cauayan was formally founded by Don Vicente Paulo Decena, believed to have come from Cebu. During the Spanish era, a seat for the municipal government was sought. Guiljungan, Cauayan and Isio were candidates but Isio prevailed as it was more populated. It received the honor of being the center of government although gobernadorcillos were accorded to Cauayan and Guiljungan.

Progress was stalled during that period since the Spanish rulers were reluctant to educate their subjects. Even when they built schools, only a few privileged were admitted to them. There were no roads and most people were required to render forced labor. When the Americans came in 1904, the tribunal in Isio was shifted to Cauayan and this fostered socioeconomic development. The inhabitants of Cauayan were taught modern agricultural techniques to raise crops, and public infrastructure such as schoolhouses, roads and bridges were built.

Geography
Located on the southern portion of the province, Cauayan is bounded on the east by the municipality of Ilog; on the south by the municipality of Candoni; on the west by the mining city of Sipalay and on the north by Panay Gulf with its bountiful fishing grounds.

The municipality of Cauayan has a rugged topography.  Mt. Malipantao, considered the highest peak in the province, separates the municipality from the town of Candoni and the city of Sipalay.  Portion of the ranges are the remaining thick forest that needs protection where the watershed is located.  The remaining portions of the municipality are slightly rolling to moderate large areas of flat lands center on the different barrios, which is much suited to agriculture.

The municipality consists mainly of the following slope distribution:

From gently sloping at 0-3 percent or equivalent to 5,369.42 hectares to moderately sloping at 3-8 percent or a total of 1,059.40 hectares to rolling lands with slopes ranging from 8-18 percent which covers to about 1,716.94 hectares.  A bigger portion is moderately steep with a slope distribution ranging from 18 to 30 percent having a total area of 19,419.42 hectares.  However, large areas are steep and mountains with a slope of 30-50 percent, which accounts to 21,181.92 hectares, and to very steep hills and mountains with a slope of over 50 percent, which covers to about 3,246.90 hectares.  Moderately large areas of flat land center on the different barrios.  However, the southern part of the municipality is hilly.  The Poblacion and the 12 barangays along the seashore are approximately 0-3 degrees above sea level.

Barangays
The Municipality of Cauayan is made up of 25 barangays, categorized into the Coastal and the Upland Barangays.

Climate

Demographics

Economy

Tourism

Tourism has recently picked up in the Cauayan Municipality, with its fine white sand beaches and diverse marine and wildlife.

Punta Bulata Resort & Spa, the most developed resort in the area, with an AA accreditation from the Department of Tourism, has seen tourists from all parts of the world who come to relax, bask in the tropical atmosphere and enjoy the marine life that is among the best in the country.

Danjugan Island Marine Reserve is a wildlife sanctuary in Barangay Bulata is also one of the most recognized dive spots in the region. Once featured on the cover of Mabuhay Magazine, this island has one of the most diverse and highly dense coral life in the world, comparable to the Great Barrier Reef. Visitors may go for day-trips to the island with pre-arranged visits by contacting Danjugan Island or through Punta Bulata Resort.

The Lubay-lubay Festival and Feast of the Conversion of St. Paul is held annually on January 25.

Community services

Health
The main concern of the Local Government Unit of Cauayan is the provision of adequate health facilities and services to its constituents. The Rural Health Unit in the Poblacion is supported by 24 Barangay Health Stations and 22 sub-stations located in the different barangays. Complementing the health services is the newly operated Cauayan District Hospital managed by the Local Government Unit located in Barangay Isio. Services offered include medical consultation, maternal and child care, immunization, control of diarrheal diseases, control of acute respiratory infection, family planning, nutrition, tuberculosis control, leprosy control, dental health, rabies control, malaria control, sexually transmitted disease control, AIDS prevention, cancer control, dengue control, cardiovascular disease prevention and control, prevention of blindness, environmental sanitation and care of the elderly.

Social welfare
The Municipal Social Welfare and Development Office is charged with the function of accelerating delivery of social services in the municipality.  The target outreach for welfare services is generally classified as follows: family heads, children, out-of-school youths, disabled, special groups, distressed families and rebel returnees.

Social services are rendered to Family Heads and Other Needy Adults (FHONA), needy children, youth, disabled/elderly, women, and the distressed. Social programs include Self-Employment Assistance Program, day care and supplemental feeding, Emergency Assistance, Self-Employment Assistance, Relief Assistance, and Responsible Parenthood/Pre-Marriage Counseling. Cauayan also offers social services like Child Abuse, Youthful Offenders, Peer Group Services, Organization of Elderly Groups, Organization of Barangay Council for Protection of Children, and Organization of Barangay Disaster Coordinating Council.

Peace and order
The municipality police force has a total strength of 28 members who maintain the peace and order and assist with emergencies.  It is complemented by the 4th Mobile Coy PNP or Provincial Mobile Group (PMG) in maintaining peace and order especially in the campaign against subversives and lawless elements in the town and nearby municipalities.  This is further augmented by the 61st Infantry Battalion of the Philippine Army based in Barangay Tiling.

Infrastructure
The municipality can be reached through public utility buses and jeeps plying the route Bacolod-Cauayan-Sipalay-Hinoba-an with terminals in Bacolod City and sub-terminals in Kabankalan City on a scheduled basis.  Transportation facilities plying the route from the Kabankalan to the different barangays and vice versa are public utility jeeps with terminals in other growth centers aside from Poblacion.  There are about 525 units of public tricycles being utilized for short-distance travel.

The municipality has a total road length of 298 kilometers.  Of this, barangay roads constitute 70.57 percent or an aggregate of 210.29 kilometers.  Most of the barangay roads are still unpaved with a total of 192.98 kilometers categorized under the gravel road surface.  Only 2.31 kilometers and three kilometers are of concrete and asphalt, respectively. Ranked next is the national road with a total of 64 kilometers or about 21.5 percent.   Of the total, 62 kilometers are concrete asphalt and the remaining two kilometers as concrete road surface.  The provincial roads, on the other hand, comprise 20.5 kilometers or equivalent to only 6.9 percent of the total road length where 17 kilometers are still classified under the gravel road surface.  The municipal roads represent about 1.1 percent or a total of 3.21 kilometers; they are all of concrete surface and basically service the urban center with a total projected population of 7,096.

The municipality has no land line telephone connections.  The only available facilities are the two telephone franchise holders or public calling offices: Philippine Long Distance Telephone Office (PLDT-PCO) and Bayan Telephone Services.

Mailing services are mainly handled by the Bureau of Posts which is headed by a postmaster and two postmen.  Other telecommunication services are the municipal radio station and the PC/PNP radio station with their citizens band radio operated by the office of the mayor and the PC/PNP, respectively.  The former is engaged in communication services to and from the provincial offices and other municipal offices, while the latter specializes in communication services directly related to peace and order radio messages.

One of the major sources of power is the Negros Occidental Electric Cooperative (NOCECO), which started providing electric power in September 1982.  It only covers six barangays; however, with an increasing population, the demand for electric power is also increasing.  As a result, out of 25 barangays, 23 are already energized. The remaining two barangays settled down to kerosene, which is still widely used by the remaining 73 percent of the total number of potential consumers who are not served by the electric cooperative.

There are two levels of water supply in the municipality. Level I refers to point sources of water such as wells, springs and rain collectors. Level II refers to communal faucet systems.  The municipality is deficient in the point of piped potable water available for residential and commercial purposes.

There are 18 existing waterworks system under the Level II water system found in 18 barangays with one faucet in every cluster of houses, or a total of 386 faucets.  Except for Barangay Inayawan, which is operated by the cooperative, the rest are managed by the Barangay Council.  Since the municipality is still generally rural, the local waterworks system uses communal faucets where houses are densely clustered enough to justify a piped distribution system providing a number of households with faucets.  In other barangays, household consumers pay a flat rate at a minimum of P10.00 per month while others operate their water system for free.

Education
The municipality is divided into two school districts, Cauayan I and Cauayan II, which offer complete elementary and secondary education. It also offers non-formal education to out-of-school youths.  There are in the municipality 62 elementary schools. 31 have complete elementary education and the remaining 30 schools only cater to primary education.  From these 62 elementary schools, 21 are located along the highway, some are near the seacoast, and the rest are widely scattered in the mountainous area of the municipality.

For secondary education, there are seven main national high schools and three private secondary schools. Among the excelling schools are Guiljungan National High School, Tuyom National High School, Eva J Montilla National High School and Camalandaan National High School, which cater quality education. Students have competitively participated in divisional and regional conferences from these schools and honorarily brag awards.

To further provide the educational and/or tertiary needs of the Cauayanons, through the municipal government's Memorandum of Agreement (MOA), the Negros Occidental Agriculture College (NOAC), now Negros Occidental State College of Agriculture (NESCA) - Cauayan Campus was officially opened last June 8, 1999.

Notable personalities

Angel Alcala (1929-2023) - biologist who was conferred as National Scientist of the Philippines in 2014.

Education
Name of School currently it's CENTRAL PHILIPPINES STATE UNIVERSITY (CPSU) not NESCA anymore.
https://www.google.com/search?gs_ssp=eJzj4tLP1TewTM8oyCg0YPRSSU7NKylKzFEoyMjMySwoyMxLLVYoLkksSVUozcssSy0qziypBAC3qxJx&q=central+philippines+state+university&rlz=1C1CHBF_enPH883PH883&oq=Central+Philippines&aqs=chrome.1.69i57j46i512l3j0i512j46i512j0i512l3.9012j0j15&sourceid=chrome&ie=UTF-8
https://lawphil.net/statutes/repacts/ra2012/ra_10228_2012.html

References

External links
 [ Philippine Standard Geographic Code]
Philippine Census Information
Local Government Unit
Local Governance Performance Management System

Municipalities of Negros Occidental